Malena may refer to:

People

Professional name
 Maléna (singer) (born 2007), Armenian singer

Given name
Malena Ernman (born 1970), Swedish opera singer
Malena Alterio (born 1974), Argentine-born Spanish actress
Malena Josephsen (born 1977), Faroese football midfielder
Malena Cano (also known as La Perla), ranchero music and mariachi singer
Malena Burke (born 1958), Cuban singer
Malena Belafonte, Danish fashion model turned singer, performer
Malena Watrous, American novelist
Malena Mörling (born 1965) Swedish-American poet and translator
 Malena Gracia (born 1971), Spanish actress, singer, and TV presenter
 Malena (pornstar) (born 1983), pseudonym of Filomena Mastromarino, a politician, pornstar, and contestant on L'Isola dei Famosi 12
 Malena Nunes (born 1995), Brazilian YouTuber

Surname
Ben Malena (born 1992), Canadian football player
Marion Malena, American Samoan beauty pageant winner
Lena Malena, actress in the 1928 American drama film Tropic Madness

Music
 "Malena" (tango), a 1941 tango song
Malèna (soundtrack), a soundtrack of the 2000 film Malèna
 "Malena", a song from the soundtrack by Ennio Morricone and recorded on Paradiso
 "Malena", a song by Dolly Parton and sung with Porter Wagoner on the 1969 album Always, Always
 "Malena", a song by the Yugoslavian rock groups Videosex and Idoli from the EP VIS Idoli

Other 
 Malèna (film), a 2000 Italian romantic comedy-drama film
 Malena (stork)

See also
 Marlene (disambiguation)
 Milena (disambiguation)
 Molina (disambiguation)
 Malina (disambiguation)
 Melena
 Melina (disambiguation)
 Milina, Serbia
 Molena, Georgia, United States